Front was an illustrated weekly newspaper published by the Military Publishing and Press Center (Vojnoizdavački i novinski centar) of the Yugoslav People's Army.

The paper was first published on 25 February 1945. Serving as a reporting tool for the Syrmian Front and other areas of military operations during final phases of the Yugoslav liberation war. It was published in all of the languages of the newly re-constituted country.

The publisher's address was: Nedeljni Ilustrovani List Front (Weekly Illustrated Paper – Front), 11001 Beograd, Ulica Svetozara Markovića 70.

In 1975, by edict of the President of the Republic, Marshal Josip Broz (Tito), Front was awarded the Order of the Brotherhood and Unity with golden wreath (I. rank).

See also
 Territorial Defense Forces (Yugoslavia)
 Yugoslav Partisans
 SFRJ

References

Magazines established in 1945
Military magazines published in Yugoslavia
Magazines with year of disestablishment missing
Weekly magazines
Defunct magazines published in Yugoslavia
Magazines published in Yugoslavia